Jean Girardet (1709–1778) was a French painter of portrait miniatures.

Early life
Girardet was born in Lunéville, and initially tried a number of fields including as a seminarian, a law student, and a cavalry officer. He settled on art after enrolling in Nancy-Université, under the direction of Claude Charles (1661-1747). He completed his studies in 1738.

Painting
He became a talented portraitist, and became the official painter of Stanisław Leszczyński, where he would be commissioned to paint all the courtiers and artists and nobility. Girardet was appointed "Ordinary Painter to the King of Poland" in 1758. He also excelled in large decorative and religious paintings. His works adorn the Toul Cathedral, as well as churches in Lunéville, Chanteheux, Commercy, Verdun and Metz.
One of his most successful works were the paintings of the City Hall of Nancy. He is also the author of one of the first paintings dedicated to the Sacred Heart in St. Stephen's Toul Cathedral.

Teaching
Although there was no local academy, Girardet taught fine arts in workshops, some of which had as many as a 140 students. In 1758, he was appointed "First Painter." In 1766, after the death of Leszczyński, the queen of France Marie Leszczyńska, only surviving daughter of Leszczyński, took him into his service.

Death
Girardet continued his work at Versailles but returned quickly to Nancy where he died in his house at No. 31 rue Saint-Jean, Nancy. He was buried in the cemetery of St. Sebastian Church Nancy.

References
 Gérard Voreaux, Girardet, A Lorraine Painter at the Court of King Stanislas, Place Stanislas Ed, Abbeville, 2007, printed in Paillart.

1709 births
1778 deaths
18th-century French painters
French male painters
French portrait painters
Portrait miniaturists
People from Lunéville
Nancy-Université alumni
18th-century French male artists